Nest is the fourth studio album by Canadian rock band Odds. It was the band's last album until the release of "Cheerleader" in 2008.

"Someone Who's Cool" was the album's most successful single, peaking at #2 in Canada. The album's second single, "Make You Mad", was also a top 10 hit.

Track listing
All songs written by Odds (Craig Northey, Doug Elliott, Pat Steward, Steven Drake)
 "Someone Who's Cool" - 3:17
 "Make You Mad" - 4:07
 "Hurt Me" - 3:45
 "Heard You Wrong" - 3:59
 "Tears & Laughter" - 4:05
 "Nothing Beautiful" - 3:07
 "Say You Mean It Wondergirl" - 3:16
 "Out Come Stars" - 4:24
 "Night's Embrace" - 3:59
 "Suppertime" - 3:51
 "At Your Word" - 3:57

References

1996 albums
Odds (band) albums
Elektra Records albums